Secret Ceremony is a 1968 British drama-thriller film directed by Joseph Losey and starring Elizabeth Taylor, Mia Farrow and Robert Mitchum.

Plot
Leonora, a middle-aged prostitute, is despondent over the death of her daughter. Cenci, a lonely young woman, follows Leonora to the cemetery and strikes up a conversation with her, inviting Leonora to her home. Leonora is struck by the likeness between Cenci and her late daughter.

A resemblance of Leonora to Cenci's late mother becomes obvious once Leonora notices a portrait. Cenci, who is 22 but looks and acts much younger, asks Leonora to stay. A lie is told to her aunts, Hilda and Hannah, that Leonora is actually Cenci's late mother's cousin.

Cenci is found one day cowering under a table. Albert, her stepfather, has paid a visit. Cenci is terrified of him, claiming that Albert had raped her. Leonora is repelled by the man's presence until Albert tells her that Cenci is mentally unstable and had repeatedly tried to seduce him.

On a beach one day, Cenci and Albert have sexual relations. A despondent Cenci commits suicide. At the funeral, Leonora now knows whom she chooses to believe. After standing beside Albert in silence during the burial, Leonora produces a knife and stabs him.

The film ends with Leonora lying in the bedroom of her apartment, listlessly hitting the cord of a ceiling lamp while reciting a poem about perseverance.

Cast
 Elizabeth Taylor as Leonora
 Mia Farrow as Cenci
 Robert Mitchum as Albert
 Peggy Ashcroft as Hannah
 Pamela Brown as Hilda

Rest of cast listed alphabetically:
 Robert Douglas as Sir Alex Gordon
 George Howell as First Cleaner
 Penelope Keith as Hotel Assistant
 Roger Lloyd Pack as Cleaner
 Angus MacKay as Vicar
 Michael Strong as Dr. Walter Stevens

Production
The short story on which the film is based won a $5,000 prize in a competition run by Life en Español. It had already been filmed for Argentine television when it was optioned in 1963 by Dore Schary.

In an October 1969 interview with Roger Ebert, Mitchum claimed that the film's production was "in trouble" when he arrived and that his presence did not help.

Locations
The main location for the film was Debenham House in London. Other London locations were St Mary Magdalene Church in Paddington, the area around the Molyneux Monument in Kensal Green Cemetery and the junction of Chepstow Road and St Stephen's Mews in Paddington. The hotel and beach scenes were shot around the Grand Hotel Huis ter Duin in Noordwijk, The Netherlands.

Reception
Secret Ceremony has divided critics since its release. Renata Adler in the New York Times wrote that it was "incomparably better" than its predecessor, Accident, and that beneath its "elaborate fetishism and dragging prose, there is a touching story of people not helping enough," but she admitted that the film had its "longueurs, but not beyond endurance." Ernest Callenbach of Film Quarterly wrote it was "difficult to guess" what the film was about, but felt that its "dominant note, if there is one, is of Losey's usual creepy, misanthropic disgust with sex and how people misuse each other to get it." He also praised Mia Farrow's "touching and perverse and human" performance. Writing 30 years later after its release, John Patterson of The Guardian listed Secret Ceremony among the Losey films he dismissed as "woefully misguided material." Similarly, Dave Kehr of the Chicago Reader lambasted the film as embodying the director's "worst tendencies as a filmmaker: the movie is cold without being chilling, confusing without being challenging."

References

External links

 
 
 
 
 

1968 films
1968 drama films
1960s British films
1960s English-language films
1960s thriller drama films
British thriller drama films
Films based on Argentine novels
Films directed by Joseph Losey
Films scored by Richard Rodney Bennett
Films set in London
Films shot at Associated British Studios
Universal Pictures films